Harvey Lawrence Pekar (October 8, 1939 – July 12, 2010) was an American underground comic book writer, music critic, and media personality, best known for his autobiographical American Splendor comic series. In 2003, the series inspired a well-received film adaptation of the same name.

Frequently described as the "poet laureate of Cleveland", Pekar "helped change the appreciation for, and perceptions of, the graphic novel, the drawn memoir, the autobiographical comic narrative." Pekar described his work as "autobiography written as it's happening. The theme is about staying alive, getting a job, finding a mate, having a place to live, finding a creative outlet. Life is a war of attrition. You have to stay active on all fronts. It's one thing after another. I've tried to control a chaotic universe. And it's a losing battle. But I can't let go. I've tried, but I can't."

Among the awards given to Pekar for his work were the Inkpot Award, the American Book Award, a Harvey Award, and his posthumous induction into the Eisner Award Hall of Fame.

Life
Harvey Pekar and his younger brother Allen were born in Cleveland, Ohio, to a Jewish family. Their parents were Saul and Dora Pekar, immigrants from Białystok, Poland. Saul Pekar was a Talmudic scholar who owned a grocery store on Kinsman Avenue, with the family living above the store. Although Pekar said he wasn't close to his parents due to their dissimilar backgrounds and because they worked all the time, he still "marveled at how devoted they were to each other. They had so much love and admiration for one another."

Pekar's first language as a child was Yiddish and he learned to read and appreciate novels in the language.

Pekar said he did not have friends for the first few years of his life. The neighborhood he lived in had once been all white but became mostly black by the 1940s. One of the only white kids still living there, Pekar was often beaten up. He later believed this instilled in him "a profound sense of inferiority." This experience, however, also taught him to become a "respected street scrapper."

Pekar graduated from Shaker Heights High School in 1957. He then briefly served in the United States Navy. After being discharged he attended Case Western Reserve University, where he dropped out after a year. He worked odd jobs before he was hired as file clerk at the Veterans Administration Hospital in 1965. He held this job after becoming famous, refusing all promotions, until he retired in 2001.

Pekar was married three times. He was married from 1960 to 1972 to his first wife, Karen Delaney. According to R. Crumb, who knew the couple socially, "She left him.... She took all the money out of their bank account and ran off.... Never heard from her again."

His second wife was Helen Lark Hall, who appeared (as "Lark") in a number of early issues of American Splendor. They married in 1977. According to Crumb again (and as dramatized in the American Splendor film), "...she was trying to have a career in academia and Harvey would embarrass her. They'd go to these academic cocktail parties and Harvey would deliberately antagonize these professors. He thought the whole academia thing was bullshit. So he used to embarrass her and she'd become angry at him until finally she gave up on him." They divorced in 1981.

Pekar's third wife, whom he married in 1984, was writer Joyce Brabner who became a regular character in American Splendor.

In 1990, as described by Publishers Weekly, "Pekar was diagnosed with lymphoma and needed chemotherapy. By the time the disease was discovered, the couple was in the midst of buying a house (a tremendous worry to Pekar, who fretted about both the money and corruptions of bourgeois creature comforts)." After Pekar's recovery, he and Brabner collaborated on Our Cancer Year (released in 1994), a graphic novel account of that experience, as well as his harrowing yet successful treatment.

Around this same time, Brabner and Pekar became guardians of a young girl, Danielle Batone, when she was nine years old. Danielle became the couple's foster daughter and eventually became a recurring character in American Splendor as well.

Pekar lived in Cleveland Heights, Ohio, with Brabner and Batone.

Career

Early comics work 
Pekar's friendship with Robert Crumb led to the creation of the self-published, autobiographical comic book series American Splendor. Crumb and Pekar became friends through their mutual love of jazz records. It took Pekar a decade to do so: "I theorized for maybe ten years about doing comics." Pekar's influences from the literary world included James Joyce, Arthur Miller, George Ade, Henry Roth, and Daniel Fuchs.

Around 1972, Pekar laid out some stories with crude stick figures and showed them to Crumb and another artist, Robert Armstrong. Impressed, they both offered to illustrate. Pekar & Crumb's one-pager "Crazy Ed" was published as the back cover of Crumb's The People's Comics (Golden Gate Publishing Company, 1972), becoming Pekar's first published work of comics. Including "Crazy Ed" and before the publication of American Splendor #1, Pekar wrote a number of other comic stories that were published in a variety of outlets:
 "Crazy Ed", with Robert Crumb, in The People's Comics (Golden Gate Publishing Company, 1972)
 "A Mexican Tale," with Greg Budgett and Munan, in Flaming Baloney X (Propaganda Ink, c. 1975)
 "It Pays to Advertise" with Willy Murphy, in Flamed-Out Funnies #1 (Keith Green, Aug. 1975)
 "Ain' It the Truth" with Willy Murphy, in Flamed-Out Funnies #1 (Keith Green, Aug. 1975)
 "The Boys on the Corner: A Good Shit Is Best" with Willy Murphy, in Flamed-Out Funnies #1 (Keith Green, Aug. 1975)
 "The Kinsman Cowboys: How'd Ya Get Inta This Bizness Ennyway?" with Greg Budgett & Gary Dumm, in Bizarre Sex #4 (Kitchen Sink Press, Oct. 1975)
 "Famous Street Fights: The Champ" with Robert Armstrong in Comix Book #4 (Kitchen Sink Press, Feb. 1976)
 "Don't Rain on My Parade" with Robert Armstrong in Snarf #6 (Kitchen Sink Press, Feb. 1976)

American Splendor

The first issue of Pekar's self-published American Splendor series appeared in May 1976, with stories illustrated by Crumb, Dumm, Budgett, and Brian Bram. Applying the "brutally frank autobiographical style of Henry Miller," American Splendor documented Pekar's daily life in the aging neighborhoods of his native Cleveland.

Pekar and his work came to greater prominence in 1986 when Doubleday collected much of the material from the first ten issues in American Splendor: The Life and Times of Harvey Pekar, which was positively reviewed by, among others, The New York Times. (1986 was also the year Pekar began appearing on Late Night with David Letterman.)

Pekar self-published 15 issues of American Splendor from 1976 to 1991 (issue #16 was co-published with Tundra Publishing). Dark Horse Comics took on the publishing and distribution of Pekar's comics from 1993 to 2003.

In 2006, Pekar released a four-issue American Splendor miniseries through the DC Comics imprint Vertigo. This was collected in the American Splendor: Another Day paperback. In 2008 Vertigo released a second four-issue "season" of American Splendor that was later collected in the American Splendor: Another Dollar paperback.

Pekar's best-known and longest-running collaborators include Crumb, Dumm, Budgett, Spain Rodriguez, Joe Zabel, Gerry Shamray, Frank Stack, Mark Zingarelli, and Joe Sacco. In the 2000s, he teamed regularly with artists Dean Haspiel and Josh Neufeld. Other cartoonists who worked with him include Jim Woodring, Chester Brown, Alison Bechdel, Gilbert Hernandez, Eddie Campbell, David Collier, Drew Friedman, Ho Che Anderson, Rick Geary, Ed Piskor, Hunt Emerson, Bob Fingerman, and Alex Wald; as well as such non-traditional illustrators as Pekar's wife, Joyce Brabner, and comics writer Alan Moore.

In addition to his autobiographical work on American Splendor, Pekar wrote a number of biographies. The first of these, American Splendor: Unsung Hero (Dark Horse Comics, 2003), illustrated by David Collier, documented the Vietnam War experience of Robert McNeill, one of Pekar's African-American coworkers at Cleveland's VA hospital.

Stories from the American Splendor comics have been collected in many books and anthologies.

American Splendor film

A film adaptation of American Splendor was released in 2003, directed by Robert Pulcini and Shari Springer Berman. It starred Paul Giamatti as Pekar, as well as appearances by Pekar himself (and his wife Joyce, foster daughter Danielle, and co-worker Toby Radloff). American Splendor won the Grand Jury Prize for Dramatic Film at the 2003 Sundance Film Festival, in addition to the award for Best Adapted Screenplay from the Writers Guild of America. At the 2003 Cannes Film Festival, the film received the FIPRESCI critics award. American Splendor was given the Guardian New Directors Award at the 2003 Edinburgh International Film Festival. It was also nominated for Best Adapted Screenplay at the 2003 Academy Awards. Pekar wrote about the effects of the film in American Splendor: Our Movie Year.

Other comics work

On October 5, 2005, the DC Comics imprint Vertigo published Pekar's autobiographical hardcover The Quitter, with artwork by Dean Haspiel. The book detailed Pekar's early years.

In 2006, Ballantine/Random House published his biography Ego & Hubris: The Michael Malice Story about the life of Michael Malice, founding editor of Overheard in New York. In June 2007, Pekar collaborated with student Heather Roberson and artist Ed Piskor on the book Macedonia, which centers on Roberson's studies in that country. In January 2008 the biographical Students for a Democratic Society: A Graphic History was published by Hill & Wang. In March 2009, he published The Beats, a history of the Beat Generation, including Jack Kerouac and Allen Ginsberg, illustrated by Ed Piskor. In May 2009 he published Studs Terkel's Working: A Graphic Adaptation.

In 2010, Pekar started the webcomic The Pekar Project with the online magazine Smith. In 2011, Abrams Comicarts published Yiddishkeit, co-edited by Pekar with Paul Buhle and Hershl Hartman. The book depicts aspects of Yiddish language and culture. Artists in this anthology include many of Pekar's previous collaborators.

Critical writing 
Pekar was an assiduous record collector as well as a freelance book and jazz critic, focusing on significant figures from jazz's golden age but also championing out-of-mainstream artists such as Scott Fields, Fred Frith and Joe Maneri. He published his first criticism in The Jazz Review in 1959. Pekar wrote hundreds of articles for DownBeat, JazzTimes, The Village Voice, and The Austin Chronicle; as well as liner notes for Verve Records and other labels.

Pekar had a regular column, "Harvey Sez," in which he wrote about the contemporary comics scene, in the comics anthology Weirdo from 1986 to 1990. He reviewed literary fiction in the Review of Contemporary Fiction. Pekar won awards for his essays broadcast on public radio.

Theater, music and media appearances
Pekar's comic book success led to a guest appearance on Late Night with David Letterman on October 15, 1986. Pekar was invited back repeatedly and made five more appearances in quick succession. These appearances became notable for the increasing hostility and verbal altercations between Pekar and Letterman, particularly on the subject of General Electric's ownership of NBC. The most heated of these was in the August 31, 1988, episode of Late Night, in which Pekar accused Letterman of appearing to be a shill for General Electric and Letterman promised never to invite Pekar back on the show. Despite the ban, more than four years later Pekar appeared on Late Night again — on April 20, 1993, and he made a final appearance on Late Show with David Letterman on May 16, 1994. After Pekar's death, Letterman reflected in 2017 that...

Pekar appeared in Alan Zweig's 2000 documentary film about record collecting, Vinyl. In August 2007, Pekar was featured on the Cleveland episode of Anthony Bourdain: No Reservations with host Anthony Bourdain.

While American Splendor theater adaptations had previously occurred, in 2009, Pekar made his theatrical debut with Leave Me Alone!, a jazz opera for which Pekar wrote the libretto. Leave Me Alone! featured music by Dan Plonsey and was co-produced by Real Time Opera and Oberlin College, premiering at Finney Chapel on January 31, 2009.

In 2009, Pekar was featured in The Cartoonist, a documentary film on the life and work of Jeff Smith, creator of Bone.

Death and work released posthumously

Shortly before 1 a.m. on July 12, 2010, Pekar's wife found Pekar dead in their Cleveland Heights, Ohio, home. No immediate cause was determined. In October the Cuyahoga County coroner's office ruled it was an accidental overdose of antidepressants fluoxetine and bupropion. Pekar had been diagnosed with cancer for the third time and was about to undergo treatment.

Pekar was interred at Lake View Cemetery in Cleveland. His headstone features one of his quotations as an epitaph: "Life is about women, gigs, an' bein' creative."

Some Pekar works were to be released posthumously, including two collaborations with Joyce Brabner, The Big Book of Marriage and Harvey and Joyce Plumb the Depths of Depression, as well as a collection of the webcomics that ran as a part of The Pekar Project. As of 2019, however, none of those projects have yet seen print. Working with illustrator Summer McClinton, Pekar also finished a book on American Marxist Louis Proyect tentatively called The Unrepentant Marxist, after Proyect's blog. In the works since 2008, the book was to be published by Random House. After a conflict between Proyect and Joyce Brabner, Brabner announced that she would hold the book back indefinitely.

In December 2010, the last story Pekar wrote, "Harvey Pekar Meets the Thing", in which Pekar has a conversation with Ben Grimm, was published in the Marvel Comics anthology Strange Tales II; the story was illustrated by Ty Templeton.

Legacy

Frequently described as the "poet laureate of Cleveland," Pekar "helped change the appreciation for, and perceptions of, the graphic novel, the drawn memoir, the autobiographical comic narrative."

His American Splendor "remains one of the most compelling and transformative series in the history of comics." In addition, Pekar was the first author to publicly distribute "memoir comic books."  While it is common today for people to publicly write about their lives on blogs, social media platforms, and in graphic novels, "In the mid-seventies, Harvey Pekar was doing all this before it was ubiquitous and commercialized."

In October 2012 a statue of Pekar was installed at the Cleveland Heights-University Heights Library, a place he visited almost daily.

On July 25, 2015, the city of Cleveland Heights, Ohio dedicated the corner of Northwest Coventry Road and Euclid Heights Boulevard to the life and legacy of Harvey Pekar. This area is now known as Harvey Pekar Park.

Awards
 1986: Inkpot Award
 1987: American Book Award for American Splendor: The Life and Times of Harvey Pekar
 1995: Harvey Award Best Graphic Album of Original Work (for Our Cancer Year)
 2000: PRNDI (Public Radio News Directors Incorporated) Commentary/Essay first prize for the essay, "What's in a Name"
 2001: RTNDA (Radio-Television News Directors Association) Regional Edward R. Murrow Award for Best Writing for the essay, "Father's Day"
 2011: Eisner Award Hall of Fame

Bibliography

Comics format 
 American Splendor: The Life and Times of Harvey Pekar  (Doubleday, 1986)
 More American Splendor (Doubleday, 1987) 
 The New American Splendor Anthology (Four Walls Eight Windows, 1991) 
 Our Cancer Year, with Joyce Brabner and Frank Stack (Four Walls Eight Windows, 1994) 
 American Splendor Presents: Bob & Harv's Comics, with R. Crumb (Four Walls Eight Windows, 1996) 
 American Splendor: Unsung Hero, with David Collier (Dark Horse Comics, 2003) 
 American Splendor: Our Movie Year (Ballantine Books, 2004) 
 Best of American Splendor (Ballantine Books, 2005)  Selections from his later, Dark Horse period.
 The Quitter, with Dean Haspiel (DC/Vertigo, 2005) 
 American Splendor: Ego & Hubris - The Michael Malice Story, with Gary Dumm (Ballantine Books, 2006) 
 Macedonia, with Heather Roberson and Ed Piskor (Ballantine Books, 2006) 
 American Splendor: Another Day (DC/Vertigo, 2007) 
 Students for a Democratic Society: A Graphic History, edited by Paul Buhle, with art (mostly) by Gary Dumm (Hill & Wang, 2008) 
 American Splendor: Another Dollar (DC/Vertigo, 2009) 
 The Beats: A Graphic History, mostly by Pekar with contributions by other writers (including Joyce Brabner). Art mostly by Ed Piskor, with additional art by Jay Kinney, Nick Thorkelson, Summer McClinton, Peter Kuper, Mary Fleener, Gary Dumm, Lance Tooks, Jeffrey Lewis, and others. Edited by Paul Buhle (Hill & Wang, 2009) 
 Studs Terkel's Working: A Graphic Adaptation, edited by Paul Buhle . With art by Sharon Rudahl, Terry LaBan, Gary Dumm, Peter Gullerud, Pablo G. Callejo, et al. (The New Press, 2009)

Published posthumously 
 Yiddishkeit: Jewish Vernacular and the New Land, co-edited with Paul Buhle. With art by Barry Deutsch, Peter Kuper, Spain Rodriguez , Sharon Rudahl, et al. (Harry N. Abrams, 2011) 
 Huntington, West Virginia: "On the Fly", with Summer McClinton (Villard, 2011) 
 Not the Israel My Parents Promised Me, with JT Waldman. Epilogue by Joyce Brabner. (Hill & Wang, 2012) 
 Harvey Pekar's Cleveland, illustrated by Joseph Remnant. Introduction by Alan Moore. Edited by Jeff Newelt (ZIP Comics and Top Shelf Productions, 2012)

Prose 
 Circus Parade by Jim Tully.  Foreword by Harvey Pekar. Introduction by Paul J. Bauer and Mark Dawidziak. (Kent State Univ. Press, 2009) 978-1-60635-001-0

References

External links
 
 Interview on The Sound of Young America: MP3 Link
 Article by James Hynes about Pekar's last appearance on Late Night with David Letterman
 "I Don't Know, Man — A Tribute to Harvey Pekar" at Scholars and Rogues, October 8, 2010
 November 10, 2005 Interview on Fresh Air with Terry Gross
 Boppin' With Pekar, a one-hour public radio program on jazz history with Harvey Pekar, Jerry Zolten, and Phoebe Gloeckner
 
 "Harvey Pekar dead: American Splendor comic writer was 70" Terence McArdle, The Washington Post, July 13, 2010

1939 births
2010 deaths
20th-century American male writers
21st-century American male writers
Accidental deaths in Ohio
American autobiographers
American Book Award winners
American comics writers
American music critics
Burials at Lake View Cemetery, Cleveland
Drug-related deaths in Ohio
Harvey Award winners
Inkpot Award winners
Jazz writers
Jewish American writers
Jews and Judaism in Cleveland
Journalists from Ohio
Military personnel from Cleveland
People from Cleveland Heights, Ohio
United States Navy sailors
Writers from Cleveland
Writers from Shaker Heights, Ohio
20th-century American writers